This is a list of Estonian television related events from 2001.

Events
3 February - Tanel Padar and Dave Benton are selected to represent Estonia at the 2001 Eurovision Song Contest with their song "Everybody". They are selected to be the seventh Estonian Eurovision entry during Eurolaul held at the ETV Studios in Tallinn.
12 May - Estonia wins the 46th Eurovision Song Contest in Copenhagen, Denmark. The winning song is "Everybody", performed by Tanel Padar and Dave Benton.

Debuts

International
15 February -  L.A. Heat

Television shows

1990s
Õnne 13 (1993–present)
Wremja (2001–2003)

Ending this year

Births

Deaths